Constitution of the Cisalpine Republic may refer to the following texts of the Cisalpine Republic:

Constitution of the Cisalpine Republic (1797)
Constitution of the Cisalpine Republic (1798)
Constitution of the Cisalpine Republic (1801)